Åbjøra or Åelva is a river in the municipality of Bindal in Nordland county, Norway. It begins in the mountains between the Tosen fjord and the Namdalen valley. It is a small river but good for fishing for salmon or sea trout.

References

Rivers of Nordland
Bindal
Rivers of Norway